Burgos BH is a UCI ProTeam cycling team based in Burgos, Spain. The team was founded in 2006 under the name of "Viña Magna-Cropu".

Doping
In December 2017, David Belda was given a four-year ban after testing positive for EPO.

In July 2018, Igor Merino tested positive for growth hormone in a sample taken during June.

In November 2018, Ibai Salas was handed a four-year doping ban for violations of the biological passport programme. As a result of this third anti-doping violation in the past 12 months, the team faces a potential suspension ranging between 15 and 45 days.

Team roster

Major wins

2006
Stage 4 Vuelta a la Comunidad de Madrid, Óscar Grau
Overall Vuelta a Navarra, Jesús Tendero
Stage 1 Vuelta a Asturias, Óscar Grau
Grand Prix Cristal Energie, Carlos Torrent
Stage 2 Vuelta a Burgos, Carlos Torrent
Stage 10 Tour de l'Avenir, Sergio Pardilla
2007
Stage 1 Vuelta a Cuba, Victor Gomes
Stages 3 & 6 Vuelta a Cuba, Bruno Lima
Stage 5 Cinturón a Mallorca, Diego Gallego
Stage 2 Vuelta Ciclista a León, Victor Gomes
Stage 4 Vuelta Ciclista a León, Carlos Torrent
Overall Tour des Pyrénées, Sergio Pardilla
Stage 2, Ivan Gilmartín
Stage 3, Sergio Pardilla
2008
Stage 3 Vuelta a La Rioja, Sergio Pardilla
Stage 2 Vuelta a Navarra, Joaquín Sobrino
Stage 2 Vuelta Mexico Telmex, Joaquín Sobrino
2009
Stage 1 Vuelta a Castilla y León, Joaquín Sobrino
2011
Stage 2 Mi-Août Bretonne, David Belda
2012
Stage 4 Vuelta Ciclista a León, Moisés Dueñas
2013
Stage 2 Tour des Pays de Savoie, Jesús del Pino
2014
Overall Vuelta a Castilla y León, David Belda
Stage 2, David Belda
Stage 3 Tour de Korea, Juan José Oroz
Stages 3 & 5 Volta a Portugal, David Belda
2015
Stage 4 Rhône-Alpes Isère Tour, David Belda
Overall Tour des Pays de Savoie, David Belda
Stage 1, David Belda
2017
Overall Tour de Gironde, Pablo Torres
Stage 2, Pablo Torres
2018
Stage 12 Tour of Qinghai Lake, Daniel López
2019
Stage 3 Troféu Joaquim Agostinho, José Fernandes
Stage 13 Tour of Qinghai Lake, Matthew Gibson
Stage 5 Vuelta a España, Ángel Madrazo
2022
 National Road Race Championships, Mihkel Räim
Stage 8 Volta a Portugal, Victor Langellotti
Stage 8 Tour de Langkawi, Alex Molenaar
2023
Stage 5 La Tropicale Amissa Bongo, Miguel Ángel Fernández
 National Time Trial Championship, Eric Fagúndez

National champions
2022
 Estonian Road Race, Mihkel Räim
2023
 Uruguayan Time Trial, Eric Fagúndez

See also
List of cycling teams in Spain

References

External links
Team Profile

UCI Professional Continental teams
Cycling teams based in Spain
Cycling teams established in 2006